Walnut is an unincorporated community in Quitman County, Mississippi. Walnut is located on Mississippi Highway 322, southwest of Lambert.

References

Unincorporated communities in Quitman County, Mississippi
Unincorporated communities in Mississippi